Glenn Lindgren (born Glenn Michael Lindgren; February 9, 1955 - September 16, 2017) was a chef, food writer, and frequent guest on both television and radio. He graduated from the University of St. Thomas in 1977. Lindgren has been involved in the food, restaurant, and travel industries through the creation and management of four popular websites and his creation and marketing of the Three Guys From Miami, an entertainment partnership that promotes Cuban food and culture.

Lindgren is the author of two popular cookbooks: Three Guys From Miami Cook Cuban and Three Guys From Miami Celebrate Cuban.

Professional career

Television
Lindgren was featured in Keith Famie's Adventures: Miami and South Beach on the Food Network in 2002 and in Tyler's Ultimate: The Ultimate Paella on the Food Network in 2003. He also appeared in Christmas in America: Miami Noche Buena on the Food Network, which originally aired December 14, 2003. Lindgren also appeared on CBS Sunday Morning in 2005 and was featured in a Public television documentary, La Cocina Cubana: Secretos de Mi Abuela -- The Cuban Kitchen: My Grandmother's Secrets, which aired May 26, 2005.
Taste of America on the Travel Channel: Cuban Tamales.  Original air date: June 21, 2005
Three Guys From Miami Cook Cuban a cooking show on WPBT Public Television Miami
Despierta América: Camarones con Arroz Amarillo Original air date: October 7, 2005

Radio
The Splendid Table on National Public Radio.
All Things Considered on National Public Radio.
Several Appearances on Food & Wine Talk on WDNA Radio Miami

Personal life

Lindgren grew up in Minneapolis and first came to Miami in 1984, where he began his studies in Cuban and Latin cuisine.  He died while hiking in Minnesota.

Books
Three Guys From Miami Cook Cuban, 2004, 
Three Guys From Miami Celebrate Cuban, 2006,

References

American television chefs
American food writers
American male chefs
Living people
1955 births